Michal Vorel (born 27 June 1975 in Prague) is a Czech football goalkeeper.

External links
 

1975 births
Living people
Czech footballers
Czech First League players
Dukla Prague footballers
SK Slavia Prague players
FC Vysočina Jihlava players
FK Chmel Blšany players
FK Mladá Boleslav players
SFC Opava players
FK Dukla Prague players
Association football goalkeepers
SK Sparta Krč players
Footballers from Prague